Ben James Roberts (born 22 June 1975) is an English former professional footballer who played as a goalkeeper. Since being forced into early retirement in 2005 at the age of 29 through injury, he has become a goalkeeping coach. He is currently employed in this capacity at Chelsea.

Early Career at Middlesbrough

Roberts began his career at Middlesbrough F.C. on the Youth Training Scheme in 1991, aged 16, and quickly graduated through the ranks, making his first team debut aged 19 in the Anglo Italia Cup in Ancona. Loan spells at Hartlepool United in 1994, Wycombe Wanderers during the 1994/1995 season and Bradford City in 1996 preceded his Premier League debut against Sheffield Wednesday in February 1997.

Also in 1997, Roberts made one appearance for England at under-21 level.

After an injury to Mark Schwarzer, Roberts finished the ill-fated 1996/97 season as Middlesbrough's first-choice goalkeeper, notably playing in the 1997 FA Cup Final, League Cup final replay and the club's remaining Premier League games (Schwarzer was cup-tied for the FA Cup run anyway). He is remembered among Middlesbrough supporters for conceding a goal after only 43 seconds by Roberto Di Matteo of Chelsea in the FA Cup Final.

Roberts' remaining time with Middlesbrough saw him struggle with fitness and injuries, and between back operations he spent time on loan at Millwall and Luton Town in 1999 and 2000. He helped Millwall reach the 1999 Football League Trophy Final, where they lost to Wigan Athletic.

Later career

Roberts transferred to Charlton Athletic in the summer of 2000. While with Charlton, he had further loan spells at Reading, Luton and Brighton & Hove Albion, before making a permanent move to Brighton in 2003. His only appearance for Charlton had come on the last day of the 2002/2003 season, Roberts playing as a substitute against Fulham after Dean Kiely was sent off.

Roberts contributed to Brighton's promotion-winning season in 2003–04, making 35 appearances as first-choice goalkeeper, the season culminating in victory in the 2004 Second Division play-off final at the Millennium Stadium against Bristol City.

However, in 2005, a recurrent back injury forced him to retire from playing at the age of 29.

After retirement

After retiring, Roberts went to university, graduating from Roehampton University with a first class honours degree in sports science and coaching, and won the Adidas 'Pursuit of Excellence' award for his dissertation, which was entitled 'A Biomechanical Analysis of a Football Goalkeeper's Jumping Technique'.

Coaching career

In June 2009, having briefly come out of retirement to join Derry City in 2007, Roberts was appointed the goalkeeper coach and chief scout at Yeovil Town.
During the two seasons he spent at Yeovil Town, he assisted in the development of goalkeepers Alex McCarthy and Stephen Henderson, making a substitute appearance himself in a 3–3 draw with Swindon Town in October 2010, his first league match in six years.

On 29 December 2010, he left Yeovil Town to return to their League One rivals Charlton Athletic. During his tenure at Charlton, Roberts oversaw the early careers of Rob Elliot, Ben Hamer, Neil Etheridge, Marko Dmitrovic, Dillon Phillips, David Button and Nick Pope.

On 23 June 2015, Roberts returned to Brighton & Hove Albion as goalkeeping coach, replacing Antti Niemi, who had left for Finland that summer. During the last four seasons he has played a pivotal role in the careers of the Goalkeepers at the Sussex club. Amongst those that Roberts has coached and developed during this period are Mat Ryan, David Stockdale, Christian Walton and Robert Sanchez.

On 8 September 2022, Roberts followed Graham Potter on a move to Chelsea.

Outside football

After retiring from football in 2005, Roberts took a year out before university to backpack around the world, which included a 6-month spell living in Brazil where he closely studied Brazilian training methods.

He is also a keen runner, taking part in the London Marathon and Great North Run for the Asthma UK charity.

References

External links

Roberts on Zanziball

1975 births
Living people
Sportspeople from Bishop Auckland
Footballers from County Durham
English footballers
Association football goalkeepers
England under-21 international footballers
Premier League players
English Football League players
Middlesbrough F.C. players
Hartlepool United F.C. players
Wycombe Wanderers F.C. players
Bradford City A.F.C. players
Millwall F.C. players
Charlton Athletic F.C. players
Luton Town F.C. players
Reading F.C. players
Brighton & Hove Albion F.C. players
Brighton & Hove Albion F.C. non-playing staff
Yeovil Town F.C. players
Charlton Athletic F.C. non-playing staff
Derry City F.C. players
Association football goalkeeping coaches
FA Cup Final players
Chelsea F.C. non-playing staff